The 2015–16 Atlanta Hawks season was the 67th season of the franchise in the National Basketball Association (NBA) and the 48th in Atlanta.

In the off-season, the Hawks introduced a new logo and uniforms for the season.

In the regular season, the Hawks came 12 games short of tying their franchise-best 60–22 record from their previous season. They defeated the Boston Celtics in the opening round, but were swept in four games by the LeBron James-led and eventual NBA champion Cleveland Cavaliers in the Semifinals, who had also swept them in last season's Eastern Conference Finals as well as the 2009 Eastern Conference Semi-finals.

Also, this season was the end of the Al Horford era in Atlanta, as he joined the Celtics during the following season.

Key dates
 June 25: The 2015 NBA draft took place at Barclays Center in Brooklyn, New York.
 July 1: 2015 NBA free agency begins.
 November 24: The Atlanta Hawks would retire Dikembe Mutombo's number 55.

Draft picks

Roster

Game log

Pre-season

|- style="background:#bfb;"
| 1
| October 7
| @ Cleveland
| 98–96
| Jeff Teague (17)
| Al Horford (8)
| Shelvin Mack (5)
| Cintas Center10,250
| 1–0
|- style="background:#bfb;"
| 2
| October 9
| @ New Orleans
| 103–93
| Dennis Schröder (11)
| Paul Millsap (8)
| Patterson, Teague (3)
| Veterans Memorial Arena7,628
| 2–0
|- style="background:#bfb;"
| 3
| October 14
| San Antonio
| 100–86
| Jeff Teague (19)
| Paul Millsap (9)
| Horford, Schröder (4)
| Philips Arena11,801
| 3–0
|- style="background:#bfb;"
| 4
| October 16
| @ Dallas
| 91–84
| Al Horford (16)
| Mike Scott (6)
| Mack, Schröder (4)
| American Airlines Center19,315
| 4–0
|- style="background:#fbb;"
| 5
| October 18
| Miami
| 92–101
| Mike Scott (19)
| Mike Scott (8)
| Lamar Patterson (4)
| Philips Arena13,038
| 4–1
|- style="background:#fbb;"
| 6
| October 21
| Memphis
| 81–82
| Kent Bazemore (18)
| Al Horford (14)
| Jeff Teague (9)
| Philips Arena11,273
| 4–2
|- style="background:#fbb;"
| 7
| October 23
| @ Detroit
| 87–115
| Mike Scott (20)
| Walter Tavares (12)
| Lamar Patterson (6)
| The Palace of Auburn Hills12,804
| 4–3

Standing

Regular season game log

|-style="background:#fbb;"
| 1
| October 27
| Detroit
| 
| Dennis Schröder (20)
| Paul Millsap (8)
| Horford, Schröder, Teague (4)
| Philips Arena19,187
| 0–1
|- style="background:#bfb;"
| 2
| October 29
| @ New York
| 
| Jeff Teague (23)
| Paul Millsap (11)
| Jeff Teague (8)
| Madison Square Garden19,812
| 1–1
|-style="background:#bfb;"
| 3
| October 30
| Charlotte
| 
| Kent Bazemore (19)
| Paul Millsap (10)
| Millsap & Teague (4)
| Philips Arena17,024
| 2–1
,
|- style="background:#bfb;"
| 4
| November 1
| @ Charlotte
| 
| Kent Bazemore (20)
| Al Horford (12)
| Paul Millsap (6)
| Time Warner Cable Arena18,691
| 3–1
|- style="background:#bfb;"
| 5
| November 3
| @ Miami
| 
| Jeff Teague (29)
| Al Horford (13)
| Jeff Teague (9)
| American Airlines Arena19,600
| 4–1
|- style="background:#bfb;"
| 6
| November 4
| Brooklyn
| 
| Al Horford (21)
| Paul Millsap (9)
| Jeff Teague (6)
| Philips Arena14,044
| 5–1
|- style="background:#bfb;"
| 7
| November 6
| @ New Orleans
| 
| Korver, Millsap (22)
| Paul Millsap (12)
| Jeff Teague (7)
| Smoothie King Center16,983
| 6–1
|- style="background:#bfb;"
| 8
| November 7
| Washington
| 
| Kent Bazemore (25)
| Al Horford (9)
| Jeff Teague (8)
| Philips Arena18,047
| 7–1
|- style="background:#fbb;"
| 9
| November 9
| Minnesota
| 
| Jeff Teague (24)
| Bazemore, Horford (6)
| Jeff Teague (9)
| Philips Arena12,016
| 7–2
|- style="background:#bfb;"
| 10
| November 11
| New Orleans
| 
| Al Horford (26)
| Paul Millsap (16)
| Jeff Teague (10)
| Philips Arena15,597
| 8–2
|- style="background:#fbb;"
| 11
| November 13
| @ Boston
| 
| Paul Millsap (14)
| Paul Millsap (8)
| Al Horford (8)
| TD Garden17,138
| 8–3
|- style="background:#fbb;"
| 12
| November 15
| Utah
| 
| Paul Millsap (28)
| Millsap, Schröder, Sefolosha (6)
| Dennis Schröder (9)
| Philips Arena14,436
| 8–4
|- style="background:#fbb;"
| 13
| November 17
| @ Brooklyn
| 
| Al Horford (18)
| Thabo Sefolosha (7)
| Dennis Schröder (10)
| Barclays Center12,241
| 8–5
|- style="background:#bfb;"
| 14
| November 18
| Sacramento
| 
| Paul Millsap (23)
| Paul Millsap (16)
| Dennis Schröder (6)
| Philips Arena13,008
| 9–5
|- style="background:#fbb;"
| 15
| November 21
| @ Cleveland
| 
| Korver, Millsap (14)
| Paul Millsap (11)
| Paul Millsap (5)
| Quicken Loans Arena20,562
| 9–6
|- style="background:#bfb;"
| 16
| November 24
| Boston
| 
| Paul Millsap (25)
| Paul Millsap (9)
| Jeff Teague (9)
| Philips Arena18,968
| 10–6
|- style="background:#fbb;"
| 17
| November 25
| @ Minnesota
| 
| Millsap, Teague (22)
| Al Horford (12)
| Jeff Teague (5)
| Target Center14,289
| 10–7
|- style="background:#bfb;"
| 18
| November 27
| @ Memphis
| 
| Paul Millsap (23)
| Paul Millsap (14)
| Jeff Teague (7)
| FedExForum17,684
| 11–7
|- style="background:#fbb;"
| 19
| November 28
| @ San Antonio
| 
| Mike Scott (12)
| Paul Millsap (8)
| Dennis Schröder (6)
| AT&T Center18,418
| 11–8
|- style="background:#bfb;"
| 20
| November 30
| Oklahoma City
| 
| Paul Millsap (26)
| Al Horford (13)
| Thabo Sefolosha (6)
| Philips Arena17,768
| 12–8

|- style="background:#fbb;"
| 21
| December 2
| Toronto
| 
| Paul Millsap (14)
| Horford, Millsap (9)
| Jeff Teague (10)
| Philips Arena12,559
| 12–9
|- style="background:#bfb;"
| 22
| December 4
| L. A. Lakers
| 
| Al Horford (16)
| Al Horford (9)
| Horford, Teague (5)
| Philips Arena19,051
| 13–9
|- style="background:#bfb;"
| 23
| December 9
| @ Dallas
| 
| Paul Millsap (20)
| Paul Millsap (11)
| Jeff Teague (6)
| American Airlines Center19,936
| 14–9
|- style="background:#fbb;"
| 24
| December 10
| @ Oklahoma City
| 
| Kent Bazemore (22)
| Paul Millsap (8)
| Korver, Millsap, Teague (4)
| Chesapeake Energy Arena18,203
| 14–10
|- style="background:#fbb;"
| 25
| December 12
| San Antonio
| 
| Paul Millsap (22)
| Al Horford (7)
| Dennis Schröder (7)
| Philips Arena17,752
| 14–11
|- style="background:#fbb;"
| 26
| December 14
| Miami
| 
| Kent Bazemore (28)
| Paul Millsap (9)
| Dennis Schröder (7)
| Philips Arena15,039
| 14–12
|- style="background:#bfb;"
| 27
| December 16
| Philadelphia
| 
| Paul Millsap (28)
| Kent Bazemore (7)
| Korver, Schröder (7)
| Philips Arena14,827
| 15–12
|- style="background:#bfb;"
| 28
| December 18
| @ Boston
| 
| Dennis Schröder (22)
| Al Horford (10)
| Jeff Teague (6)
| TD Garden18,624
| 16–12
|- style="background:#bfb;"
| 29
| December 20
| @ Orlando
| 
| Kyle Korver (19)
| Paul Millsap (13)
| Horford, Teague (6)
| Amway Center16,982
| 17–12
|-style="background:#bfb;"
| 30
| December 21
| Portland
| 
| Dennis Schröder (18)
| Kent Bazemore (7)
| Jeff Teague (8)
| Philips Arena18,373
| 18–12
|-style="background:#bfb;"
| 31
| December 23
| Detroit
| 
| Jeff Teague (23)
| Bazemore, Teague (6)
| Jeff Teague (9)
| Philips Arena17,575
| 19–12
|-style="background:#bfb;"
| 32
| December 26
| New York
| 
| Paul Millsap (22)
| Paul Millsap (7)
| Horford, Millsap (7)
| Philips Arena19,015
| 20–12
|-style="background:#fbb;"
| 33
| December 28
| @ Indiana
| 
| Paul Millsap (24)
| Al Horford (10)
| Kent Bazemore (6)
| Bankers Life Fieldhouse18,165
| 20–13
|-style="background:#bfb;"
| 34
| December 29
| @ Houston
| 
| Al Horford (30)
| Al Horford (14)
| Jeff Teague (8)
| Toyota Center18,211
| 21–13

|-style="background:#fbb;"
| 35
| January 3
| @ New York
| 
| Paul Millsap (19)
| Paul Millsap (9)
| Paul Millsap (6)
| Madison Square Garden19,812
| 21–14
|-style="background:#fbb;"
| 36
| January 5
| New York
| 
| Paul Millsap (19)
| Al Horford (8)
| Horford, Schröder (8)
| Philips Arena15,082
| 21–15
|- style="background:#bfb;"
| 37
| January 7
| @ Philadelphia
| 
| Kent Bazemore (22)
| Al Horford (9)
| Dennis Schröder (6)
| Wells Fargo Center12,611
| 22–15
|-style="background:#bfb;"
| 38
| January 9
| Chicago
| 
| Al Horford (33)
| Al Horford (10)
| Dennis Schroder (8)
| Philips Arena19,010
| 23–15
|-style="background:#fbb;"
| 39
| January 13
| @ Charlotte
| 
| Al Horford (20)
| Millsap, Muscala, Schröder (10)
| Dennis Schroder (6)
| Time Warner Cable Arena15,334
| 23–16
|-style="background:#fbb;"
| 40
| January 15
| @ Milwaukee
| 
| Paul Millsap (23)
| Paul Millsap (10)
| Jeff Teague (10)
| BMO Harris Bradley Center15,144
| 23–17
|-style="background:#bfb;"
| 41
| January 16
| Brooklyn
| 
| Paul Millsap (21)
| Millsap, Schröder (6)
| Dennis Schroder (10)
| Philips Arena17,052
| 24–17
|- style="background:#bfb;"
| 42
| January 18
| Orlando
| 
| Al Horford (15)
| Paul Millsap (12)
| Dennis Schröder (8)
| Philips Arena17,460
| 25–17
|- style="background:#bfb;"
| 43
| January 20
| @ Portland
| 
| Bazemore, Millsap (23)
| Paul Millsap (9)
| Jeff Teague (6)
| Moda Center18,783
| 26–17
|- style="background:#fbb;"
| 44
| January 21
| @ Sacramento
| 
| Paul Millsap (14)
| Paul Millsap (14)
| Schröder, Teague (4)
| Sleep Train Arena17,019
| 26–18
|- style="background:#fbb;"
| 45
| January 23
| @ Phoenix
| 
| Kent Bazemore (21)
| Al Horford (16)
| Horford, Schröder (5)
| Talking Stick Resort Arena17,034
| 26–19
|- style="background:#bfb;"
| 46
| January 25
| @ Denver
| 
| Paul Millsap (22)
| Paul Millsap (9)
| Jeff Teague (10)
| Pepsi Center10,280
| 27–19
|- style="background:#fbb;"
| 47
| January 27
| L. A. Clippers
| 
| Jeff Teague (16)
| Paul Millsap (12)
| Al Horford (6)
| Philips Arena17,664
| 27–20
|- style="background:#fbb;"
| 48
| January 28
| @ Indiana
| 
| Jeff Teague (20)
| Kent Bazemore (9)
| Jeff Teague (5)
| Bankers Life Fieldhouse15,196
| 27–21
|-style="background:#fbb;"
| 49
| January 31
| @ Miami
| 
| Horford, Millsap (17)
| Kent Bazemore (10)
| Jeff Teague (6)
| American Airlines Arena19,937
| 27–22

|- style="background:#bfb;"
| 50
| February 1
| Dallas
| 
| Jeff Teague (32)
| Paul Millsap (12)
| Jeff Teague (8)
| Philips Arena15,455
| 28–22
|- style="background:#bfb;"
| 51
| February 3
| @ Philadelphia
| 
| Hardaway Jr., Scott (13)
| Scott (9)
| Hardaway Jr., Horford (4)
| Wells Fargo Center10,429
| 29–22
|- style="background:#bfb;"
| 52
| February 5
| Indiana
| 
| Paul Millsap (24)
| Al Horford (7)
| Kent Bazemore (8)
| Philips Arena17,225
| 30–22
|- style="background:#fbb;"
| 53
| February 7
| @ Orlando
| 
| Jeff Teague (24)
| Paul Millsap (9)
| Al Horford (6)
| Amway Center16,021
| 30–23
|- style="background:#fbb;"
| 54
| February 8
| Orlando
| 
| Al Horford (27)
| Bazemore, Millsap (13)
| Millsap, Schröder (6)
| Philips Arena13,057
| 30–24
|- style="background:#bfb;"
| 55
| February 10
| @ Chicago
| 
| Dennis Schröder (18)
| Bazemore, Hardaway Jr., Muscala (6)
| Jeff Teague (8)
| United Center21,709
| 31–24
|- align="center"
|colspan="9" bgcolor="#bbcaff"|All-Star Break
|- style="background:#fbb;"
| 56
| February 19
| Miami
| 
| Jeff Teague (23)
| Paul Millsap (13)
| Jeff Teague (7)
| Philips Arena19,043
| 31–25
|- style="background:#fbb;"
| 57
| February 20
| Milwaukee
| 
| Paul Millsap (27)
| Paul Millsap (11)
| Dennis Schröder (10)
| Philips Arena18,653
| 31–26
|- style="background:#fbb;"
| 58
| February 22
| Golden State
| 
| Al Horford (23)
| Al Horford (16)
| Horford, Teague (6)
| Philips Arena18,717
| 31–27
|- style="background:#bfb;"
| 59
| February 26
| Chicago
| 
| Jeff Teague (19)
| Paul Millsap (13)
| Jeff Teague (9)
| Philips Arena18,123
| 32–27
|-style="background:#bfb;"
| 60
| February 28
| Charlotte
| 
| Kent Bazemore (14)
| Al Horford (16)
| Al Horford (6)
| Philips Arena17,156
| 33–27

|- style="background:#fbb;"
| 61
| March 1
| @ Golden State
| 
| Paul Millsap (19)
| Bazemore, Horford (9)
| Dennis Schröder (9)
| Oracle Arena19,596
| 33–28
|- style="background:#bfb;"
| 62
| March 4
| @ L.A. Lakers
| 
| Dennis Schröder (16)
| Kris Humphries (8)
| Jeff Teague (8)
| Staples Center18,997
| 34–28
|- style="background:#bfb;"
| 63
| March 5
| @ L.A. Clippers
| 
| Jeff Teague (22)
| Paul Millsap (18)
| Jeff Teague (7)
| Staples Center19,236
| 35–28
|- style="background:#bfb;"
| 64
| March 8
| @ Utah
| 
| Jeff Teague (24)
| Paul Millsap (9)
| Jeff Teague (6)
| Vivint Smart Home Arena19,282
| 36–28
|- style="background:#fbb;"
| 65
| March 10
| @ Toronto
| 
| Al Horford (20)
| Kent Bazemore (8)
| Jeff Teague (7)
| Air Canada Centre19,800
| 36–29
|- style="background:#bfb;"
| 66
| March 12
| Memphis
| 
| Al Horford (19)
| Thabo Sefolosha (11)
| Jeff Teague (7)
| Philips Arena17,515
| 37–29
|- style="background:#bfb;"
| 67
| March 13
| Indiana
| 
| Horford, Millsap (19)
| Paul Millsap (9)
| Jeff Teague (9)
| Philips Arena17,066
| 38–29
|- style="background:#bfb;"
| 68
| March 16
| @ Detroit
| 
| Jeff Teague (22)
| Al Horford (11)
| Jeff Teague (9)
| Palace of Auburn Hills14,121
| 39–29
|- style="background:#bfb;"
| 69
| March 17
| Denver
| 
| Tim Hardaway Jr. (21)
| Paul Millsap (11)
| Jeff Teague (8)
| Philips Arena14,383
| 40–29
|- style="background:#bfb;"
| 70
| March 19
| Houston
| 
| Al Horford (22)
| Paul Millsap (10)
| Jeff Teague (7)
| Philips Arena18,067
| 41–29
|- style="background:#fbb;"
| 71
| March 21
| Washington
| 
| Jeff Teague (23)
| Al Horford (9)
| Al Horford (9)
| Philips Arena15,729
| 41–30
|- style="background:#bfb;"
| 72
| March 23
| @ Washington
| 
| Dennis Schröder (23)
| Paul Millsap (9)
| Dennis Schröder (8)
| Verizon Center18,807
| 42–30
|- style="background:#bfb;"
| 73
| March 25
| Milwaukee
| 
| Jeff Teague (18)
| Paul Millsap (13)
| Jeff Teague (6)
| Philips Arena17,070
| 43–30
|- style="background:#bfb;"
| 74
| March 26
| @ Detroit
| 
| Paul Millsap (23)
| Paul Millsap (9)
| Jeff Teague (12)
| The Palace of Auburn Hills17,857
| 44–30
|-style="background:#bfb;"
| 75
| March 28
| @ Chicago
| 
| Jeff Teague (26)
| Paul Millsap (11)
| Jeff Teague (7)
| United Center21,761
| 45–30
|-style="background:#fbb;"
| 76
| March 30
| @ Toronto
| 
| Jeff Teague (18)
| Paul Millsap (9)
| Al Horford (3)
| Air Canada Centre19,800
| 45–31

|- style="background:#fbb;"
| 77
| April 1
| Cleveland
| 
| Paul Millsap (29)
| Paul Millsap (12)
| Jeff Teague (9)
| Philips Arena19,427
| 45–32
|- style="background:#bfb;"
| 78
| April 5
| Phoenix
| 
| Jeff Teague (20)
| Paul Millsap (17)
| Paul Millsap (8)
| Philips Arena15,176
| 46–32
|- style="background:#bfb;"
| 79
| April 7
| Toronto
| 
| Jeff Teague (23)
| Paul Millsap (14)
| Al Horford (6)
| Philips Arena17,864
| 47–32
|- style="background:#bfb;"
| 80
| April 9
| Boston
| 
| Paul Millsap (31)
| Paul Millsap (16)
| Jeff Teague (7)
| Philips Arena19,257
| 48–32
|- style="background:#fbb;"
| 81
| April 11
| @ Cleveland
| 
| Kent Bazemore (23)
| Al Horford (11)
| Jeff Teague (9)
| Quicken Loans Arena20,562
| 48–33
|- style="background:#fbb;"
| 82
| April 13
| @ Washington
| 
| Al Horford (19)
| Paul Millsap (16)
| Jeff Teague (5)
| Verizon Center17,399
| 48–34

Playoffs

Game log

|- style="background:#bfb;"
| 1
| April 16
| Boston
| 
| Al Horford (24)
| Al Horford (12)
| Jeff Teague (12)
| Philips Arena18,980
| 1–0
|- style="background:#bfb;"
| 2
| April 19
| Boston
| 
| Horford, Korver (17)
| Kent Bazemore (9)
| Jeff Teague (6)
| Philips Arena18,972
| 2–0
|- style="background:#fbb;"
| 3
| April 22
| @ Boston
| 
| Jeff Teague (23)
| Al Horford (13)
| Al Horford (6)
| TD Garden18,624
| 2–1
|- style="background:#fbb;"
| 4
| April 24
| @ Boston
| 
| Paul Millsap (45)
| Paul Millsap (13)
| Horford, Teague (5)
| TD Garden18,624
| 2–2
|- style="background:#bfb;"
| 5
| April 26
| Boston
| 
| Mike Scott (17)
| Horford, Millsap (8)
| Millsap, Sefolosha (6)
| Philips Arena18,987
| 3–2
|- style="background:#bfb;"
| 6
| April 28
| @ Boston
| 
| Paul Millsap (17)
| Kyle Korver (9)
| Dennis Schröder (8)
| TD Garden18,624
| 4–2

|- style="background:#fbb;"
| 1
| May 2
| @ Cleveland
| 
| Dennis Schröder (27)
| Paul Millsap (13)
| Dennis Schröder (6)
| Quicken Loans Arena20,562
| 0–1
|- style="background:#fbb;"
| 2
| May 4
| @ Cleveland
| 
| Paul Millsap (16)
| Paul Millsap (11)
| Jeff Teague (6)
| Quicken Loans Arena20,562
| 0–2
|- style="background:#fbb;"
| 3
| May 6
| Cleveland
| 
| Al Horford (24)
| Paul Millsap (8)
| Jeff Teague (14)
| Philips Arena19,089
| 0–3
|- style="background:#fbb;"
| 4
| May 8
| Cleveland
| 
| Dennis Schröder (21)
| Paul Millsap (9)
| Dennis Schröder (6)
| Philips Arena19,031
| 0–4

Player statistics

Regular season

|- align="center" bgcolor=""
|  || 75 || 68 || 27.8 || .441 || .357 || .810 || 5.1 || 2.3 || 1.3 || .5 || 11.6
|- align="center" bgcolor="#f0f0f0"
|  || 51 || 1 || 16.9 || .430 || .338 || .890 || 1.7 || 1.0 || .4 || .1 || 6.4
|- align="center" bgcolor=""
| * || 11 || 0 || 6.9 || .182 || .167 || .000 || 1.1 || 1.3 || .2 || .1 || .5
|- align="center" bgcolor="#f0f0f0"
| * || 26 || 1 || 10.1 || .329 || .222 || .504 || 1.0 || .4 || .5 || .2 || 2.4
|- align="center" bgcolor=""
|  || 82 || 82 || 32.1 || .505 || .344 || .802 || 7.3 || 3.2 || .8 || 1.5 || 15.2
|- align="center" bgcolor="#f0f0f0"
| * || 21 || 0 || 14.0 || .465 || .258 || .710 || 3.4 || .6 || .5 || .3 || 6.4
|- align="center" bgcolor=""
|  || 80 || 80 || 30.0 || .435 || .399 || .830 || 3.3 || 2.1 || .8 || .4 || 9.2
|- align="center" bgcolor="#f0f0f0"
| * || 24 || 0 || 7.5 || .421 || .148 || .750 || .9 || 1.6 || .3 || .0 || 3.9
|- align="center" bgcolor=""
|  || 81 || 81 || 32.7 || .470 || .319 || .760 || 9.0 || 3.3 || 1.8 || 1.7 || 17.1
|- align="center" bgcolor="#f0f0f0"
|  || 60 || 0 || 9.4 || .500 || .308 || .790 || 2.0 || .6 || .2 || .5 || 3.3
|- align="center" bgcolor=""
|  || 35 || 0 || 11.3 || .350 || .245 || .730 || 1.4 || 1.1 || .3 || .1 || 2.4
|- align="center" bgcolor="#f0f0f0"
|  || 80 || 6 || 20.3 || .421 || .322 || .790 || 2.6 || 4.4 || .9 || .1 || 11.0
|- align="center" bgcolor=""
|  || 75 || 0 || 15.3 || .468 || .392 || .790 || 2.7 || 1.0 || .3 || .2 || 6.2
|- align="center" bgcolor="#f0f0f0"
|  || 75 || 11 || 23.4 || .505 || .339 || .630 || 4.5 || 1.4 || 1.1 || .5 || 6.4
|- align="center" bgcolor=""
|  || 36 || 2 || 16.1 || .523 || .000 || .810 || 3.3 || .8 || .6 || .3 || 5.6
|- align="center" bgcolor="#f0f0f0"
|  || 11 || 0 || 6.6 || .579 || .000 || .380 || 1.9 || .3 || .1 || .6 || 2.3
|- align="center" bgcolor=""
|  || 79 || 78 || 28.5 || .439 || .400 || .840 || 2.7 || 5.9 || 1.2 || .3 || 15.7
|}

Transactions

Overview

Trades

Free agents

Re-signed

Additions

* = Did not make 15-man roster

Subtractions

References

Atlanta Hawks seasons
Atlanta Hawks
Atlanta Hawks
Atlanta Hawks